Carcopino may refer to
Sarrola-Carcopino, a commune on the island of Corsica in France 
Departmental Museum of archaeology Gilort (Jérôme) Carcopino in Corsica
Jérôme Carcopino (1881–1970), French historian and author